Bethania Scandinavian Evangelical Lutheran Congregation is located in Ephraim, a village in Door County, Wisconsin. The church building was added to the National Register of Historic Places in 1985. Today, the church is known as Bethany Lutheran Church of Ephraim.

In 1882, six families established the Free Evangelical Lutheran Church. Within weeks, a new church building took shape. When the building was dedicated in 1882, Rev. John Torgerson, an independent Lutheran minister from Chicago, conducted the service. From 1895 to 1897, the church was affiliated with the Augustana Synod. In 1898, it became affiliated with the United Lutheran Church in America and the name of the church was changed officially to Bethania Scandinavian Evangelical Lutheran Congregation. By that date, services were conducted in the Norwegian language.

References

External links
Bethany Lutheran Church website

Churches on the National Register of Historic Places in Wisconsin
Lutheran churches in Wisconsin
Churches in Door County, Wisconsin
Carpenter Gothic church buildings in Wisconsin
Norwegian-American culture in Wisconsin
Churches completed in 1882
National Register of Historic Places in Door County, Wisconsin